Group B of UEFA Euro 2016 contained England, Russia, Wales and Slovakia. Within this group, only Russia was a former European champion, having won as the Soviet Union in 1960. This was Wales' and Slovakia's first appearance at the European Championship. Matches were played from 11 to 20 June 2016.

Teams

Notes

Standings

In the round of 16,
The winner of Group B, Wales, advanced to play the third-placed team of Group C, Northern Ireland.
The runner-up of Group B, England, advanced to play the runner-up of Group F, Iceland.
The third-placed team of Group B, Slovakia, advanced as one of the four best third-placed teams to play the winner of Group C, Germany.

Matches

Wales vs Slovakia

England vs Russia

Russia vs Slovakia

England vs Wales

Russia vs Wales

Slovakia vs England

References

External links
UEFA Euro 2016 Group B

UEFA Euro 2016
England at UEFA Euro 2016
Russia at UEFA Euro 2016
Wales at UEFA Euro 2016
Slovakia at UEFA Euro 2016